, or sometimes Torne Valley or Torne River Valley lies at the border of Sweden and Finland. It is named after the Torne River flowing through the valley and into the Gulf of Bothnia. Geographically the townships and municipalities that make up the area are Haparanda, Övertorneå, Pajala and Kiruna in Sweden, and Tornio, Ylitornio, Pello, Kolari, Muonio and Enontekiö in Finland. Culturally the highland Swedish municipality Gällivare is sometimes also considered part of Meänmaa due to the large share of Meänkieli-speaking population in it. Torne Valley should not be confused with Torne Valley Sub-region.

Meänkieli surnames and village names are common on the Swedish side of the border to this day, in spite of the dominance of the Swedish language in the area. The Finnish side of the border has standard Finnish as the sole spoken language.

History and culture 

The cultural environment around the Torne River is characterized by agriculture, reindeer farming and fishing.
Meänmaa was one of the oldest inhabited areas in northern Finland. Archeological excavations have revealed evidence of permanent settlements at least from the 11th century, but there are signs of earlier settlements.
Agriculture has long been practiced on the fertile flooding meadows by the river. Trading routes followed the river and some trading centers were formed. One of the centers since 16th century was the island Oravaisensaari at Vojakkala. Today, the main center is the twin city of Haparanda-Tornio.

The Finnish and Swedish sides of the river were once one cultural entity, as before 1809 they were both parts of Sweden. Once the current border between the two countries had been established, each side of the river has become influenced by the majority culture in its respective country, but still retains some traditional elements. As an example, on the Swedish side of Meänmaa one still makes types of food, such as rieska, that are usually considered Finnish rather than Swedish.

Many of the towns and villages were built around the river, and some of those were thus split in two when Finland was ceded to Russia in 1809. There are still several villages that have the same name on the Swedish and Finnish sides of the river.

Language 
On the Swedish side of the valley, Finnish was still the majority language until the 20th century. This is obvious in the many Finnish village and other place names on the Swedish side of the border. The number of Finnish speakers has now declined drastically, because of national Swedish influence and compulsory schooling in Swedish. People in the younger generations mostly have Swedish as their mother tongue.

The local form of speech, Meänkieli, has today been acknowledged as a minority language in Sweden. The people who speak it are often referred to as Tornedalians, although this term could also be defined as referring to people living in Meänmaa, who are not all speakers of Meänkieli. The originally Finnish-speaking land area is far greater than the actual river valley; it extends as far west as Gällivare. Although confusing from a geographic point of view, this whole area is often referred to as Meänmaa.

The area where Meänkieli is spoken is also called Meänmaa. Since 15 June, 2006, the Tornedalians have their own flag.

See also 
 French Geodesic Mission to Lapland

References

External links 

 Nils Johan's genealogy site - A related website is that of Nils Johan Fosli, a genealogist from Norway whose roots also lie in Meänmaa.  Nils Johan is "the" expert on Troms genealogy.
 Släktforskning i Tornedalen - Another genealogical website that is specifically about the Meänmaa people.  However, the website narrative is written in Swedish.
 Sveriges Riksdag - Meänkieli - Website of Swedish parliament in the language of Meänkieli.

Sápmi
Sub-regions of Finland
Geography of Lapland (Finland)
Geography of Norrbotten County
Torne river basin
Divided regions